Split Image may refer to:
 Split-image focusing screen
 Split Image (album), a 1987 album by Excel
 Split Image (film), a 1982 film starring James Woods
 Split Image (novel), a 2010 crime novel by Robert B. Parker
 Split Images, a 1981 crime novel by Elmore Leonard
 Split image, an underwater photography composition that includes roughly half above the surface and half underwater